Bonar is both a surname of Scottish origin, and a given name. Notable people with the name include:

Surname
Aiden Bonar (born 1999), Australian footballer
Andrew Bonar (1810–1892), Scottish minister
Brian Bonar (born 1947), American businessman
Bud Bonar (1906–1970), American football player
Dan Bonar (born 1956), Canadian ice hockey player
Haley Bonar (born 1983), Canadian-born American singer-songwriter
Horatius Bonar (1808–1889), Scottish poet and minister
James Bonar (civil servant) (1852–1941), Scottish civil servant, economist and historian
James Bonar (politician) (1840–1901), New Zealand merchant, shipping agent, company director and politician
Jane Lundie Bonar (1821–1884), Scottish hymnwriter
John Bonar (set decorator) (1886–1963), American set decorator
Maureen Bonar (born 1962), Canadian curler
Paul Bonar (born 1976), Scottish footballer
Thomson Bonar (1738–1814), Scottish publisher

Given name
Bonar Bain (1923–2005), Canadian actor
Bonar Colleano (1924–1958), American actor
Bonar Law (1858–1923), British politician and Prime Minister of the United Kingdom

References

Surnames of Scottish origin